The London Terminal Control Centre (LTCC) was an air traffic control centre based in West Drayton, in the London Borough of Hillingdon, England, approximately  north of London Heathrow Airport.  Operated by National Air Traffic Services (NATS) it provided air traffic control services to aircraft arriving and departing from six London airports, one Royal Air Force station, plus en-route services to other aircraft that entered its airspace.  Internally within NATS it is usually known by the initials TC.  The civilian part of the West Drayton site closed in November 2007, when its functions moved to Swanwick, Hampshire. 'TC' and 'AC' (London Area Control Centre) remain separate organisations but now share the same site.

Unlike New York TRACON, LTCC uses Class A airspace. Therefore, VFR operation is prohibited.

History
The centre was opened as RAF West Drayton, a military air traffic control facility, located roughly midway between the then London airport (now London Heathrow) and RAF Northolt.  The civilian control function present at this centre in 1971 became the London Air Traffic Control Centre (LATCC), operating alongside the RAF.  In the early 1990s the 'Central Control Facility' (CCF) was formed within the centre to provide terminal control services to aircraft arriving at and departing from the main London airports, subsuming the existing terminal sectors in preparation for the arrival of the London area airport approach units. For this, the CCF Display and Information System (CDIS) was developed.

In 1992 the Heathrow and Gatwick approach control units moved to West Drayton to share facilities with the CCF.  The CCF and the two approach control units were moved into the new Terminal Control room in 1995, and thus became a separate entity to Area Control. To reflect the fact that there were now two civil control rooms (Area and Terminal) the centre was renamed the London Area and Terminal Control Centre, whilst retaining the same LATCC abbreviation.

RAF West Drayton formally closed in the 1990s, though military personnel remained on site until 2008.

In 1995 Stansted approach control, soon after to be renamed Essex Radar, moved to West Drayton to take their place in the TCR. In 2002 Luton approach control also moved in.  In the same year, the Area Control function moved from West Drayton to the new London Area Control Centre (LACC) in Swanwick, Hampshire.  The West Drayton facility was renamed the London Terminal Control Centre (LTCC - though still pronounced "latsea") at this time.  In 2004, Thames Radar (London City and Biggin Hill radar approach control) moved in from its former home at Heathrow Tower.

Civilian operations at the centre ceased in November 2007, after Terminal Control moved to Swanwick to be reunited with Area Control. Military operations moved to a new control room also at Swanwick in January 2008.

One of the last PDP11 based air traffic control systems from LATCC is now on display at The National Museum of Computing.

See also
 Linesman/Mediator

External links 

 Our control centres , NATS
 

Air traffic control centers
Air traffic control in the United Kingdom
Buildings and structures in the London Borough of Hillingdon
Buildings and structures in Hampshire
Aviation in England
Aviation in London
Buildings and structures at Heathrow Airport
Transport in the London Borough of Hillingdon
History of Heathrow Airport